Adelaide Knight, also known as Eliza Adelaide Knight, (1871–1950), was a British suffragette.

Biography 
Born in Tower Hamlets in 1871, Eliza Adelaide ("Addy") Knight was a frail child, born with deformed thumbs, who had two accidents in childhood which led to her enduring poor health. Due to her childhood injuries, she used a stick or crutches.

Arrest
In 1906 suffragettes Knight, Annie Kenney, and Mrs. Jane Sbarborough were arrested along with Teresa Billington-Greig when they tried to obtain an audience with H. H. Asquith, a prominent member of the Liberals. Offered either six weeks in prison or giving up campaigning for one year, despite her poor health Knight chose prison, as did the other women. Annie Kenney, in her book autobiography, describes Knight as 'extraordinarily clever'.

Later life
In 1905 Knight joined the Women's Social and Political Union and worked as secretary for the organisation's first East London branch in Canning Town, established by Annie Kenney and Minnie Baldock. She was co-opted onto the Central Committee of the WSPU, but resigned from the organisation in 1907 due to its lack of democracy, and having witnessed a false claim made by Christabel Pankhurst in order to promote enfranchisement for propertied women only.

Following this, Knight joined the Adult Suffrage Society and became the branch secretary for Canning Town. She also served as a Poor Law Guardian for West Ham. She developed a friendship with Dora Montefiore with whom she travelled to France in 1908 to address meetings there. In March 1909 Knight resigned as branch secretary, due to illness through pregnancy, and received letters of thanks. She moved from Plaistow to Abbey Wood later that year with her family. In 1920 she joined the Communist Party of Great Britain as a foundation member with Dora Montefiore  but declined an invitation to join a delegation to the Soviet Union due to poor health.
In Abbey Wood she joined the Women's Cooperative Guild and, together with her husband, the Independent Labour Party and the Workers Educational Association.

Family
Adelaide and her husband, Donald Adolphus Brown, had four children between 1895 and 1901, three of whom died in a smallpox outbreak in 1902. Adelaide gave birth to another son in 1904 and a daughter in 1909. Brown (1874-1949) was a mixed-race sailor, the son of a Guyanese father and English mother, who eventually worked as a foreman at the Woolwich Arsenal, where he received a medal for bravery for tackling a fire there. 
 
Adelaide Knight died in 1950; her husband died a year earlier. Her daughter, Winifred Langton, wrote a memoir of her parents edited by Addy's granddaughter, Fay Jacobsen, entitled, "Courage".

References

1871 births
1950 deaths
British people with disabilities
English people with disabilities
English suffragists
Women's Social and Political Union